Sebastian Isai Hernandez Lanus (born 16 January 2003) is an Israeeli professional footballer who plays as a forward for Hapoel Tel Aviv.

Personal life
Hernandez was born in Israel to a Peruvian mother and an Uruguayan father.

Career statistics

Club

References

2003 births
Living people
Footballers from Tel Aviv
Israeli footballers
Israeli people of Peruvian descent
Israeli people of Uruguayan descent
Association football forwards
Hapoel Tel Aviv F.C. players